Mariehamn Airport (  is located in Jomala, Åland (a territory of Finland). It served 61,568 passengers in 2017 and is operated by the state-owned Finavia.

The airport has a duty-free shop where passengers may purchase goods such as alcohol without paying VAT and other taxes, when flying to destinations outside Åland, including to Finland. Normally local taxes must be paid in airport shops before travelling inside the EU, but Åland is outside the EU VAT area, to allow tax-free sales onboard ferries and at the airport. Åland is in other respects a part of the EU.

The Aero Flight 217 aviation accident that resulted in 22 deaths occurred near the airport in 1963.

Airlines and destinations
The following airlines operate regular scheduled and charter flights at Mariehamn Airport:

Statistics

See also 
List of the largest airports in the Nordic countries

References

External links

 Finavia – Mariehamn Airport (official website)
 AIP Finland – Mariehamn Airport
 
 
 

Airports in Finland
Communications in Åland
Aviation in Åland
Airport
Buildings and structures in Åland
International airports in Finland